Bloodroots is a hack and slash video game developed by Paper Cult. Bloodroots was released for the Nintendo Switch, PlayStation 4, and Microsoft Windows on February 28, 2020 and Xbox Series X/S on 15 July 2021.  Inspired by the Western genre, players take control of Mr. Wolf, a man seeking revenge after his betrayal.

Gameplay
Bloodroots is an isometric hack and slash action game. As Mr. Wolf, players use a variety of melee and ranged weapons to kill on-screen enemies through various levels, which are presented in three acts. Weapons have limited durability and will break after multiple uses. Players complete levels by eliminating all enemies present in the stage, and receive a score and grade based on their performance at the end of each level.

Reception

Bloodroots received mostly positive reviews from critics. On review aggregator Metacritic, Bloodroots received a score of 81/100 for the PlayStation 4 release, 75/100 for the Nintendo Switch release, and 76/100 for the PC release. Critics praised the game's large arsenal of weapons available for the players to use, but criticized the platforming aspects of the game and unfair deaths.

Jonathon Dornbush of IGN rated the game 8/10, noting that, despite "some slippery nuisances in certain level designs, and a somewhat predictable ending to the otherwise fun story, Paper Cult has crafted a bloody fun time." Kevin McClusky of Destructoid also rated the game positively, writing that, "[despite] some minor flaws, Bloodroots is a manically fun game that oozes style."

References

2020 video games
Nintendo Switch games
PlayStation 4 games
Xbox Series X and Series S games
Hack and slash games
Indie video games
Windows games
Action video games
Video games developed in Canada
Video games about revenge